
Hill Top Correctional Centre was built to accommodate ninety eight boys.
It is operated by the Department of Correctional Services for the Ministry of National Security.

See also

List of prisons in Jamaica

External links
Aerial view.
Photos:

References

Prisons in Jamaica
Buildings and structures in Saint Ann Parish